Oclemena is a small genus of North American flowering plants in the tribe Astereae within the family Asteraceae.

It is native to northeastern North America, found in wet or dry woodlands, and sometimes in clearings in the woods, or in acid bogs and peat.

The finely woolly stem grows in a zig-zag fashion to a height . It may be red at its base.

The lanceolate leaves are numerous, arranged in a spiral whorl around a single stem. They can be sharply toothed along the margin (as in O. acuminata) or smooth (as in O. nemoralis). The leaves contain sessile resin glands.

The flower heads consist of flat-topped pink to rose-violet ray florets and yellow disk florets. There are one to a few on a plant, growing on a slender peduncle. The disk flowers are abruptly expanded at the top. The scarious floral bracts consist of narrow chlorophyllous bands, tinted with purple along the midrib.

The stipitate ovaries are generally compressed and show on the surface minute, cylindrical glands. The fruit is a glandular  achene with a double pappus of two bristled whorls.

The chromosome base number is x=9.

The Kew database Vascular Plant Families and Genera categorizes Oclamena under the genus Aster L. But taxonomically, Oclemena belongs to the North American clade of the tribe Astereae, as a basal member of one of the main branches.

 Species

 Oclemena acuminata (Michx.) Greene: Whorled wood aster, sharpleaf aster, white wood aster GA TN NC WV VA OH PA NJ DE NY CT RI MA VT NH ME NS NB QUE ONT NFL LAB
 Oclemena × blakei (Porter) G.L.Nesom  (O. acuminata × O. nemoralis) : Blake's aster MI PA NJNY CT RI MA VT NH ME NS NB QUE ONT 
 Oclemena nemoralis (Ait.) Greene: bog aster, bog nodding aster. MI DE MD PA NJ NY CT RI MA VT NH ME NS NB QUE ONT 
 Oclemena reticulata (Pursh) G.L.Nesom: pinebarren whitetop aster. FL GA AL SC

References

 Semple, J. C., S. Heard and Chunsheng Xiang, 1996. The Asters of Ontario (Compositae: Astereae): Diplactis Raf., Oclemena Greene, Doellingeria Nees and Aster L. (including Canadanthus Nesom, Symphyotrichum Nees and Virgulus Raf.). University of Waterloo Biology Series No. 30: 1-88.
 Semple, J. C., S. B. Heard and L. Brouillet. 2002. Cultivated and native asters of Ontario (Compositae: Astereae): Aster L. (including Asteromoea Blume, Diplactis Raf. and Kalimeris (Cass.) Cass.), Callistephus Cass., Galatella Cass., Doellingeria Nees, Oclemena E.L. Greene, Eurybia (Cass.) S.F. Gray, Canadanthus Nesom, and Symphyotrichum Nees (including Virgulus Raf.). University of Waterloo Biology Series No. 41: 1-134.

 

Astereae
Asteraceae genera
Flora of North America